Adolf Dehn (November 22, 1895 – May 19, 1968) was an American artist known mainly as a lithographer. Throughout his artistic career, he participated in and helped define some important movements in American art, including regionalism, social realism, and caricature. A two-time recipient of the Guggenheim Fellowship, he was known for both his technical skills and his high-spirited, droll depictions of human foibles.

Biography
Dehn was born in 1895 in Waterville, Minnesota. He began creating artwork at the age of six, and by the time of his death had created nearly 650 images.

After graduating as valedictorian from Waterville High School in 1914, he went to the Minneapolis School of Art (known today as the Minneapolis College of Art and Design), where he met and became a close friend of Wanda Gág. She was Dehn's first love and the two were "practically inseparable for the next five years... " (1916–1921). In 1917 he and Gág were two of only a dozen students in the country to earn a scholarship to the Art Students League of New York. He was drafted to serve in World War I in 1918, but declared himself a conscientious objector and spent four months in a guardhouse detention camp in Spartanburg, SC and then worked for eight months as a painting teacher at an arm rehabilitation hospital in Asheville, NC. Later, Dehn returned to the Art Students League for another year of study and created his first lithograph, The Harvest.

Early career
In 1921 Dehn's lithographs were featured in his first exhibition at Weyhe Gallery in New York City. From 1920 to 1921 in Manhattan, he was connected to New York's politically left-leaning activists. In 1921, he went to Europe. In Paris and Vienna he belonged to a group of expatriate intellectuals and artists, including Andrée Ruellan, Gertrude Stein, and ee cummings.

Dehn found living in Europe cheap and was able to embark on artist adventures of what some consider the "glory years" of the 20s. About his time in Europe, he said, "Life in Paris is simply glorious." He supported himself through his time in Europe by providing light-hearted cartoons and scenic European landscapes to editors back in the U.S. A number of the caricatures he drew depicting the Roaring 20s, burlesque, opera houses, and the café scene appeared in such magazines as Vanity Fair. Dehn himself felt that his caricatures and cartoons were different from others because his motives were "never really political" but more focused on social commentary. The fame that Dehn achieved during his time in Europe, his illustrations appearing in many leftist publications such as The Liberator, The New Masses, and The Dial, was noted by hometown paper The Minneapolis Journal in 1925. The publication described Dehn as "being born with a pitchfork in his mouth" while commenting on the worldly nature of his drawings.

His favorite medium was lithography, and he alternated between spoofing high society and creating beautiful landscapes. Throughout his time in Europe, Dehn was in contact with many other notable intellectuals and artists of the time, including Josephine Baker, Kurt Weill, and Leo Stein. It was in Paris that Dehn met his first wife, Mura Ziperovitch (Mura Dehn), a dancer who had left revolutionary Russia. Upon his return to the U.S. the Chicago Tribunes Paris edition published a farewell to Dehn, stating, "We are sorry to see that Adolf Dehn is going back to America," marking the impression his presence made among the inhabitants of Montparnasse.

Later career
In 1929 Dehn returned to New York City with his wife. In New York, he began to focus his art on depicting scenes of Manhattan, showcasing the skyline and views of the city from the Staten Island Ferry. As the Great Depression had taken hold of the country, Dehn and his wife were desperately poor, and their financial difficulties contributed to their ultimate divorce. In the 1930s, his work began to appear in magazines such as The New Yorker and Vogue. During his period as a lithographer, his striking images of New York, including Central Park, captured the essence of the Roaring 20s and the 1930s Depression.

Beginning in 1930, Dehn made numerous trips back to his home in Minnesota, where he could live cheaply, and he executed a significant number of drawings and lithographs based on Midwest scenes. He also summered on Martha's Vineyard from 1933 to 1936, often in the company of Thomas Hart Benton, Jackson Pollock, Georges Schreiber, and others in the vicinity of Gay Head and Menemsha, and joined by his girlfriend at the time, Eileen Lake.

In the early 1930s, Dehn established The Adolf Dehn Print Club and became a founding member of the Associated American Artists. Prints magazine selected Dehn as one of the 10 best printmakers in the United States in 1936.

Dehn earned a Guggenheim Fellowship in 1939, which allowed him to travel to the western United States and Mexico. In the early 40s, he worked as an instructor of etching and lithography at the Colorado Springs Fine Arts Center and received a citation from the U.S. treasury department for "Distinguished Service Rendered in Behalf of War Savings Program."

Dehn started executing watercolors in late 1936, admitting he had "been afraid of color" in the first decades of his career. He rose to the top tier of American watercolorists in short order, seen in a feature article on his landscape watercolors in Life magazine (August, 1941) and a traveling show organized by the Museum of Modern Art, "Four American Water Colorists" (1943–44) in which eleven Dehn watercolors were joined with the works of Winslow Homer, John Singer Sargent, and Charles Burchfield. Dehn's watercolors were described to have a "homely poetry with a modern sensitiveness." Watercolor painting and casein painting represented signature second and third arms of Dehn's artistic output for the rest of his career.

In 1944, Dehn met Virginia Engleman, who was working in the Associated American Artists printshop. The couple married in 1947 and enjoyed an artistic collaboration for the rest of his life. In the 1940s, Dehn began to sell more lithographs and to teach other American artists lithography techniques. In 1947 he joined the Society of American Graphic Artists, exhibiting his lithograph, Lake in Central Park, in the 32nd Annual Exhibition for $5.00. Dehn published his first book, titled Water Color Painting, in 1945. As he became more widely recognized and financially successful, he was able to travel extensively. As well as visiting and painting Key West and the southwestern region of the United States, he went to Venezuela, Cuba, Haiti, Afghanistan and other areas of the world. The wide range of subject matter found in his prints, drawings, and paintings reflects his travels. He was awarded a second Guggenheim Fellowship in 1951.

In 1961, Dehn was elected as a full academician to the National Academy of Design, and in 1965 he was elected as a member of the National Institute of Arts and Letters. He visited Paris for the last time in 1967, where he worked at the Atelier Desjobert.

Dehn died in New York City on May 19, 1968 after suffering a heart attack.  He is remembered as a prolific artist of great range. His works are held in over 100 museums (including the National Gallery of Art, National Portrait Gallery, Metropolitan Museum, Museum of Modern Art, and Whitney Museum of American Art); over 25 museums hold extensive collections of his output. Many prominent galleries represented Dehn as his fame grew, and posthumously, among them Harmon-Meek Gallery and Thomas French Fine Art.

Works

Paintings and drawings 
Dehn had a distinct style of illustration and painting. His drawings of this period exhibit freedom in line and form along with social satire. Dehn's landscapes suggest the grandeur of nature, and a signature element in them for which Dehn was praised was the magnificence of his clouds.

Prints 
Many of Dehn's prints are made using tusche, a liquid lithographic medium which allows for fluid effects. He has been called the "Debussy of American lithography" and "Dean of American lithography" by printmaking experts Clinton Adams and Philadelphia Museum of Art's Prints and Drawings curator, Carl Zigrosser. With his art Dehn introduced new techniques that had never before been used in lithography, and was praised as one of the world's leading printmakers.

Additional works and photos 
In an artist statement he wrote for an exhibit at St. Olaf College in Minnesota, Dehn said, "My paintings are my statement. What I have to offer as a painter is direct and simple and words are necessary to a greater understanding or enjoyment of them."

Collections 
Selected museum and other institutional collections holding Adolf Dehn paintings and/or prints as part of their permanent collections include the following.

Exhibition history 
Adolf Dehn exhibitions, 1915–2021:

Sources

Adams, The Sensuous Life of Adolf Dehn, p. 278
Bald, Wambly. "La Vie de Boheme (As Lived on the West Bank), Chicago Tribune, international Paris edition, March 15, 1932
Cox, "Adolf Dehn: Satirist of the Jazz Age", p. 13
Cox, Richard W. "Adolf Dehn the Minnesota Connection," Minnesota Historical Society, 1977, p. 169
"Dehn, Minneapolis Artist, Wins Vogue in New York, Paris, " Minneapolis Journal, February 25, 1925
Eliasoph, Phillip. Adolf Dehn: Midcentury Manhattan. The Artist Book Foundation. 2017
Glassco, John. Memoirs of Montparnasse. New York: New York Reviews of Books Classics, 2001, p. 12-13
Goodrich, American Watercolor and Winslow Homer, p. 91 
Jones, Arthur F., and Steve Arbury. Adolf Dehn. Radford University Foundation Press, 2003.
Letter to Emily Dehn, Dehn Family Archives 
Lumsdaine, Jocelyn Pang, and Thomas O'Sullivan. The Prints of Adolf Dehn. St. Paul, MN: Minnesota Historical Society Press, 1987.

External links
Department of the Navy, Naval Historical Center Paintings of Naval Aviation by Adolf Dehn, Gift of Abbott Laboratories
Columbus Museum of Art Web page on Dehn's 1931 lithograph, We Nordics (click on picture for larger image)
http://www.harmonmeekgallery.com/artists/dehn.html
https://web.archive.org/web/20070108040809/http://rhet5662.class.umn.edu/heroes/dehn.html
Figureworks.com/20th Century work at www.figureworks.com

1895 births
1968 deaths
American lithographers
Artists from Minnesota
Federal Art Project artists
20th-century lithographers